The  was the corporate museum operated by West Japan Railway Company (JR West) in Minato-ku, Osaka, Japan. It opened on 21 January 1962, next to Bentencho Station on the Osaka Loop Line. The collection included steam locomotives, electric locomotives, diesel locomotives, a prototype of a magnetic levitation train, and the original engine of a Messerschmitt Me 163.

The museum was closed on 6 April 2014, and the exhibits were moved to what eventually became the Kyoto Railway Museum in 2016.

See also
 Railway Museum (JR East counterpart in Saitama, Saitama)
 SCMaglev and Railway Park (JR Central counterpart in Nagoya)

References

External links

 

Defunct museums in Japan
Aerospace museums in Japan
Museums in Osaka
Railway museums in Japan
Museums established in 1962
Museums disestablished in 2014
1962 establishments in Japan
2014 disestablishments in Japan